Briatexte is a commune in the Tarn department in southern France.

Geography
The river Dadou flows westward through the northern part of the commune and crosses the village.

See also
Communes of the Tarn department

References

Communes of Tarn (department)